The 9th (Fighter) Squadron is a squadron of the Iraqi Air Force.

The MiG-19 years 
No. 9 Squadron was established in 1959, and its first mount was the Mikoyan-Gurevich MiG-19S. 16 aircraft of this type were assigned to it. Based at Rasheed Air Base, near Baghdad, it was officially declared operational on 11 June 1961. The squadron was envisaged as part of a sort of "flying praetorian guard" for Abd al-Karim Qasim's regime. However, during the 1963 Ramadan Revolution, between four and six of its aircraft were destroyed on the ground by a pair of Hawker Hunters flown by pilots supporting the coup, while none of No. 9 Squadron's pilots managed to take off to confront the coup. Subsequently, most of the squadron's pilots were arrested, and the unit was grounded. Many of the remaining personnel fled to Jordan and Syria. The unit was then disbanded.

The MiG-21 years 
In 1966, No. 9 Squadron was recreated. As of June 1967, it was still working up on MiG-21FL/PFMs. In 1973, the squadron was in the process of receiving MiG-21MFs. Midway through the conversion to the newer variant, on 6 October, all training stopped, and the squadron's older MiG-21s were transferred to al-Wallid Air Base the next morning. By the afternoon of 7 October, the first 10 aircraft were forward deployed to Dmeyr and Tsaykal Air Bases, in Syria. Because the aircraft still were in aluminum finish, the Syrians took care to apply their own camouflage colours on them.

The pilots quickly started flying combat air patrols, and had their first contacts with Israeli fighters less than an hour after their arrival. On 9 October, during a combat between two MiG-21s from No. 9 Squadron and four Israeli Mirages over the Golan Heights, one of the Iraqi pilots hit a Mirage with two R-3S missiles. However, the other was shot down and killed. The next day, a pair of MiG-21s intercepted two Israeli F-4 Phantom IIs, but they were targeted by several air-to-air missiles and had to disengage. On 12 October, MiG-21s from No. 9 Squadron escorted Iraqi MiG-17Fs that were attacking Israeli positions in the Quneitra area; while an Israeli Mirage was claimed shot down by No. 9 Squadron's commander, Major Namiq Sa'adallah, a MiG-17 was downed by the Mirages. On 13 October, a pair of MiG-21PFMs intercepted a formation of A-4 Skyhawks, and one was claimed shot down by two R-3S missiles. Later that day, a pair of MiG-21s acted as baits for a group of Israeli Mirages, one of which was shot down by surface-to-air missiles. On 23 October, Major Sa'adallah claimed a second Mirage shot down. Following the end of the war, all Iraqi units were withdrawn from Syria, including No. 9 Squadron.

In 1974, the squadron finally converted to MiG-21MFs. As of 1980, it was based at Firnas Air Base, near Mosul, with a detachment at Abu Ubayda Air Base.

Reformation on F-16s 
The squadron is now based at Balad Air Base and flies General Dynamics F-16IQ Fighting Falcons.

By November 2016 there may have been up to 14 Iraqi F-16s arrived in the country.

References

Notes

Bibliography

9th Squadron IqAF